Al-Afdal Muhammad was the last Ayyubid governor of Hama, in central Syria, reigning from 1332 to 1341. He was the son and successor of Abu'l-Fida, and a descendant of Saladin's brother Nur ad-Din Shahanshah. After the Mamluk defeat of the Mongols in 1260 at the Battle of Ain Jalut, Hama was restored as a tributary emirate and a succession of Ayyubid rulers of Kurdish origin governed the city. However, al-Afdal incurred the displeasure of his Mamluk overlords and was deposed by them in 1341.

References

Bibliography

14th-century Ayyubid rulers
14th-century Kurdish people
People from Hama
Ayyubid emirs of Hama
14th-century people from the Mamluk Sultanate